Enfant de la ville is the second studio album of Grand Corps Malade. It was released on 31 March 2008.

Track list
"Mental"
"Je viens de là"
"Comme une évidence"
"4 saisons"
"Pères et mères" (a cappella)
"À la recherche" (with Kery James and Oxmo Puccino)
"Le blues de l'instituteur"
"Rétroviseur"
"J'écris à l'oral"
"Enfant de la ville"
"La nuit"
"J'ai pas les mots"
"Avec eux"
"Underground"
"L'appartement" (a cappella)
"Du côté chance"

Music by:
S Petit Nico - 1, 2, 3, 11
Alain Lanty - 4
Gilles Bourgain - 6
Yannick Kerzanet - 7
Feed Back - 7, 9, 10, 13, 14
Baptiste Charvet - 8
Alejandro Barcelona - 9
Stéphane Palcossian - 12
JB of Diez Records - 16

Musicians
Violins: Hervé Cavelier, Hélène Corbellari
Alto : Nathalie Carlucci
Cello : Florence Hennequin
Guitar : Guillaume Farlet, Thomas Frémont, Yannick Kerzanet, Stéphane Palcossian
Bass : Xavier Zoly
Keyboards/Piano : Elie Chémali, Vahan Mardirossian, Alain Lanty
Drums : Jean-Baptiste Corto
Flute : Gilles Bourguain, Vincent Chavagnac
Accordion : Alejandro Barcelona
Percussions : Feed Back

Personnel
Production : Jean-Rachid for Anouche Productions
Realisation : Feed Back (Patrick Ferbac)
Arrangements / directing the orchestra : Gérard Daguerre
Sound engineer / Mixing : Nico (staf) Stawski
Mastering : Éric Chevet at Masterdisk Europe
Photos studio : Jean-Michel Delage
Photos cover : Stefan Rappo
Graphics : designppk08

Charts

References

2008 debut albums
Grand Corps Malade albums